The Rehabilitation Center at Hollywood Hills was a private nursing home located in Hollywood, Florida, United States with 152 beds. It was acquired by Hollywood Property Investments in 2015 after a Bankruptcy proceeding.

The facility offered services such as advanced nursing care, 24 hour nursing care, tube feeding and nutritional management.

Hurricane Irma 
After the air conditioning system failed due to a power outage during Hurricane Irma in 2017, several residents suffered from hyperthermia inside the facility. The power went off Sunday evening. The nursing home called multiple times for help and were told they were being prioritized for power restoration. The nursing home was not listed on FPL's priority restoration list and at the time of the incident there were no requirements for generators to power air condition in nursing homes in Florida. 

A moratorium on admissions was placed by the Agency for Health Care Administration. It was removed from Medicaid. The Hollywood Police Department and the Florida Department of Law Enforcement both opened a criminal investigation into the deaths at the center,. In a press release the company stated, "The Center and its medical and administrative staff diligently prepared for the impact of Hurricane Irma". In October, Governor Scott implemented emergency rules requiring assisted living facilities and nursing homes to have generators that are capable of operating air conditioners for up to four days in the event of a power outage after decades of inaction on this issue by the Florida Legislature and the Governor. On November 22, the 12 deaths at the nursing home were ruled to be homicides by heat exposure. Both medical examiners conceded in depositions that they purposely did not follow the National Guidelines for determination of manner and cause of death in a heat emergency, which were designed to protect medical examiners from political interference. One of the authors of the guidelines, Dr Jeffrey Jentzen testified that none of the deaths would have been considered homicides if the guidelines were followed. These Court hearings for the potential permanent revocation of the nursing home's license began on January 29, 2018.

The deaths at the Hollywood Hills nursing home prompted an immediate response from Florida lawmakers after years of inaction on the issue. Governor Scott signed an executive order mandating nursing facilities to have plans in place to supply emergency power for four days in the event of a power outage. Calling the incident "a tragedy of gargantuan proportion", Representative Frederica Wilson proposed all nursing and assisted-living facilities have backup generators and the ability to run air conditioning with generator power. By September 19, Senator Lauren Book filed a bill that would require such facilities to be able to use generator power for five days. About twelve bills related to nursing homes and generators were filed in the 2018 Florida Legislative session.

Closure 
An emergency order on Wednesday, September 20, 2017, by the Florida Agency for Health Care Administration (AHCA) suspended the home's license to operate, after the deaths in the aftermath of Irma. On the same day, the facility closed permanently, laying off 245 people.

Government Coverup 
Government officials vastly undercounted the deaths of Florida nursing home residents after Hurricane Irma in 2017, researchers at Brown found.

David Dosa, MD, MPH, an associate professor of medicine and of health services, policy, and practice, compared deaths at nursing homes across Florida in the 30 days after the Category 4 storm to those reported over the same period in 2015, when no hurricanes occurred in the state. In JAMA Network Open, he reported that the actual death toll was more than double what the CDC reported.  Hurricane Irma was associated with significant increases in mortality and hospitalization among the 61 564 nursing home residents in Florida nursing homes. Compared with 2015, they identified an additional 262 nursing home deaths at 30 days post exposure and 433 more deaths at 90 days. The number of 30-day postexposure deaths of nursing home residents is noteworthy because it is 139 higher than the 123 deaths reported by the Centers for Disease Control and Prevention (CDC) for the entire population of Florida.

“Our results suggest that this wasn’t an isolated phenomenon at one or two nursing homes,” says Dosa, who studies disaster management in the long-term care industry. “This occurred across the state.”

“We need to prioritize nursing homes,” he says. “I hope that this work adds to the idea that nursing homes need to be front and center in disaster management.”

The State of Florida blocked the Nursing Home from obtaining this data via public records request alleging potential privacy concerns, which effectively prevented the nursing home from using this information during the civil proceedings. Ultimately, Dr Dosa was able to obtain this information via CMS data, but it was too late to present at the civil proceedings.

Criminal Proceedings 
Criminal proceedings were initially filed against the charge nurse, a floor nurse, a licensed practical nurse and the administrator of the facility. Subsequently Criminal charges were dropped against 3 nurses 3 years later.  The defense said from the beginning there were issues with the case when Hollywood police brought forth the charges without the assistance of the State Attorney’s Office. The attorney for the remaining employee (administrator Jorge Carballo), Jim Cobb stated that he had never seen this level of malicious prosecution, including rigged homicide determinations that appeared to have been politically motivated. The Medical Examiners conceded in their depositions that the decision of homicide determinations were made by superiors before the autopsies had been conducted and they were instructed to base their findings on input from the Hollywood Police Department and disregard the nationally recognized criteria to determine manner and cause of death (which were developed precisely to protect the medical examiner from political interference)

See also
Effects of Hurricane Irma in Florida

References 

Nursing homes in the United States
Hurricane Irma